The Sukhoi Su-31 is a Russian single-engined aerobatic aircraft designed by Sukhoi as a lighter and more powerful version of the Sukhoi Su-29.

Design and development
The design of the aircraft started in 1991 as a single-seat development of the earlier Sukhoi Su-29 with a more powerful Vedeneyev M14PF engine and new landing gear. The low-wing cantilever monoplane first flew in June 1992 as the Su-29T and the first production aircraft flying in 1994.

Variants
Su-29T
Prototype single-seat aerobatic monoplane
Su-31
Production variant with fixed landing gear, sometimes known as the Su-31T.
Su-31M
Improved variant with a pilot extraction system.
Su-31M2
Further improved variant of the Su-31M with weight reduction, single piece canopy/windscreen and larger wing introduced in 1999.
Su-31U
Proposed retractable landing gear variant of the Su-31T.
Su-31X
Export variant of the Su-31T

Specifications

See also

References

External links

 Su-31 Air Races Datasheet

Su-31
2000s Russian sport aircraft
Aerobatic aircraft